Vowles is a surname. It may refer to:

 Adrian Vowles (born 1971), Australian rugby league player
 Andrew Vowles (born 1967), British trip hop musician best known for his work with Massive Attack
 Henry Hayes Vowles (1843–1905), English theologian and author
 Hugh Pembroke Vowles (1885–1951), British engineer, socialist and author
 James Vowles, Team Principal of the Williams Racing Formula One team
 Ken Vowles, Australian politician
 Margaret Winifred Vowles (1882-1932), English author on science
 William Vowles (1876-1943), Australian politician
 W.G. Vowles (1826-1912), English organ-builder